Transportation in Lebanon varies greatly in quality from the ultramodern Beirut International Airport to poor road conditions in many parts of the country. The Lebanese civil war between 1975 and 1990 and the 2006 Lebanon War with Israel severely damaged the country's infrastructure.

Roads
Lebanon has over 8,000 km of roads throughout the country, generally in good conditions, though it varies. Many highways are part of the Arab Mashreq International Road Network. The main roads in the country are:

Beirut - Byblos - Tripoli - Aarida
Beirut - Sidon - Tyre - Naqoura
Beirut - Bhamdoun Al Mhatta - Chtaura - Masnaa
Chtaura - Zahlé - Baalbek - Qaa
Chtaura - Qab Elias - Machgara - Nabatieh
Tripoli - Bsharri - Baalbek

Motorways
Part of the main road network have been updated to dual carriageway, four-lane motorways, which are the following:

Beirut - Tripoli. Length: 81 km.
Beirut - Kfar Badde. Length: 65 km.
Beirut - Mdeyrej. Length: 33 km.
Tripoli - Khane. Length: 20 km.

Buses

An overland trans-desert bus service between Beirut, Haifa, Damascus and Baghdad was established by the Nairn Transport Company of Damascus in 1923.

Beirut has frequent bus connections to other cities in Lebanon and major cities in Syria. The Lebanese Commuting Company, or LCC in short, is just one of a handful brands of public transportations all over Lebanon. On the other hand, the publicly owned buses are managed by le Office des Chemins de Fer et des Transports en Commun (OCFTC), or the "Railway and Public Transportation Authority" in English. Buses for northern destinations and Syria leave from Charles Helou Station.

Buses are popular and inexpensive and can be stopped anywhere along the way simply by hailing.

Ferries

Apart from the international airport, the Port of Beirut is another port of entry. As a final destination, anyone can also reach Lebanon by ferry from Cyprus, or Greece or by road from Damascus, etc. The Port of Tripoli (Lebanon) is also a port of entry and ferries usually come from Taşucu, Turkey.

Taxis and services

In order to get from one place to another, people can either use a service or taxis. A "service" is a lot cheaper than a "taxi" as the passenger would be sharing the cab in the first place unlike the latter, where he would have the cab to himself.

Cabs can be recognized by their red license plates (indicating that it is licensed for public transportation). The driver would pull aside for if the person hails while seeing him. He will then ask for his destination and then will decide whether he will drive the passenger with the regular fare, an extra, or not at all.

Types of taxis in Lebanon

Service-taxis

One has to specify one's destination and enter the taxi only if one's destination corresponds to the itinerary of the Service-taxi. The driver stops to pick up additional passengers anywhere on the streets and drop them off generally in main squares and main streets. It remains advantageous with very low fares.

Service-Taxi Taxi 
Local
£L2,000 ($1.33) per person or £L4,000 ($2.66) per person depending on how close/far the destination is. Prices within Beirut could vary depending on traffic and distance but overall should not exceed £L4,000 per person (Maximum of £L5,000 for Beirut outskirts). However, the driver could ask for more if the passenger intends to go to an area with high traffic like Hamra Street.
Long Distance
Starts from £L5,000 ($3.33) and goes up from there. For example, from Beirut to Sidon, the drivers usually charge in between £L50,000 ($33.33) and £L75,000 ($50).
Traditional Taxis
The driver must not pick up additional passengers. Most of these taxis are not equipped with meters, so it is important to negotiate the fare before embarking. The regular taxi fare starts at £L10,000 ($6.66).

Online services
Uber and Careem are both available in Lebanon as online services which are ordered online through the app and can be paid either online or by cash. These alternatives are sometimes cheaper than traditional taxis in Lebanon.

On-call taxis
Pick up people who have pre-booked by phone. They don't respond to hails in the street. They don't have a meter so passengers should ask the operator the price when they are booking the taxi, and double check with the driver at the end of the journey.

Carpooling
Carpolo App (https://www.carpolo.co/download-app) is an alternative mode of transportation in Lebanon. Upon downloading the app, users post their un-used seats and the app connects them with people who have matching rides. It is free for users on the public community and has private communities that can be accessed by invitation only. Carpolo uses gamification to incentivize drivers to list their empty car seats and offers incentives for carpoolers.

Port infrastructure

Airport

The main national airport is the Beirut Rafic Hariri International Airport and is located in the southern suburbs. The Travel and Tourism Competitiveness report ranked the country 51st in terms of air transport infrastructure.

In 2017, a delegation from Lebanon's Civil Aviation Authority inspected the Rene Mouawad Air Base in order to assess the needs and requirements of reconstructing the air base.

Cable Car 

A cable car, Téléphérique de Jounieh, operates in the Mount Lebanon Governorate between the coast of Jounieh and Harissa. The cable car has been active since 1965 and is 1.5 km long reaching 650 m of altitude at the top.

Rail transport

The Lebanese rail system is not currently in use, with services having ceased due to the country's political difficulties.
 For more information, check: Rail transport in Lebanon

References

External links